The Mayor of Banks Peninsula was the head of the municipal government of Banks Peninsula District, New Zealand. The mayor was directly elected using the first-past-the-post electoral system. The position existed from 1989 until 2006, when Banks Peninsula District was amalgamated into Christchurch City Council.

History
Banks Peninsula was established as part of the 1989 local government amalgamation. It amalgamated with the Christchurch City Council in March 2006.

List of mayors of Banks Peninsula
Banks Peninsula District had three mayors:

References

Banks P
Banks Peninsula
Banks P
People from Banks Peninsula